Carrel is a small lunar crater on the Mare Tranquillitatis. It has a somewhat distorted appearance, having a slight protruding bulge in the northwest rim. The interior is somewhat irregular, with ridges and some slumped material. This crater lies across a ridge in the surface of the mare.

It was named after the Nobel-winning French scientist Alexis Carrel in 1979. It was previously designated as Jansen B. The lava-flooded crater Jansen lies about to the northeast.

Views

References

External links

 LTO-60B3 Carrel — L&PI topographic map

Impact craters on the Moon